David Ridler (born 12 March 1976) is an English footballer and manager.

He began his career with Wrexham, turning professional in August 1995. In May  2001, after over 100 football league appearances, he was released and joined Macclesfield Town. In March 2003 he joined Scarborough, but left in July that year to join Shrewsbury Town. In May 2004 he was part of the Conference play-off winning side that took Shrewsbury back into the Football League.

He lost his place in the Shrewsbury side and was made available for loan in September 2004.

In March 2005 he left Shrewsbury to join Conference National side Leigh RMI.

He began the 2007–08 season with Prescot Cables, but left in October 2007 to join Winsford United.

He left Winsford to join Caernarfon Town in September  2008.

On 21 May 2009 Dave was appointed assistant manager of Prescot Cables. He became Caretaker Manager when boss Joe Gibliru left in November 2010 and was chosen as full-time boss a month later. He left the club to coach overseas in late 2011.

David is currently working with Liverpool F.C. at their academy in Egypt.

External links

Welsh Premier League profile

References

Living people
1976 births
English footballers
Wrexham A.F.C. players
Macclesfield Town F.C. players
Scarborough F.C. players
Shrewsbury Town F.C. players
Leigh Genesis F.C. players
Caernarfon Town F.C. players
Winsford United F.C. players
Prescot Cables F.C. players
English Football League players
National League (English football) players
Cymru Premier players
Footballers from Liverpool
Association football defenders